Nicolas Priet (born 31 January 1983) is a French former professional footballer who played as a defender.

Career

Youth career and England stints
Priet spent his youth career with Sainte-Marguerite, a small club in Marseille, Grenoble, and Olympique Lyonnais. He was released by Lyon at the end of his trainee contract.

In 2003 Priet trialled with Leicester City of the Premier League and, after impressing manager Micky Adams, signed a contract . At Leicester he only made a two-minute substitute appearance in the Carling Cup. Upon his release by Leicester in 2004 he moved to Doncaster Rovers. He was released by Doncaster Rovers and trialled with Swindon Town.

Return to France
Priet returned to France where he went on to play for FC Rouen, AS Saint-Priest, and FC Sète 34.

Priet joined Championnat National side AS Beauvais Oise from league rivals FC Sète 34 in July 2009.

He signed for Championnat de France amateur club AS Lyon-Duchère from AS Béziers in June 2011, who had been relegated from the league at the end of the previous season.

After finishing sixth with Lyon-Duchère in the 2013–14 season, he left the club for FC Limonest Saint-Didier.

References

External links  
 
 
 
 
 Entretien avec Nicolas Priet (Lyon-Duchère)
 ASBO : nez cassé pour Priet
 Lyon-Duchère : Nicolas Priet opérationnel face à l'OL!
 Sète : Fin de saison pour Priet
 Sète : Priet forfait trois semaines
 Foot National Profile

Living people
1983 births
French footballers
Association football defenders
Olympique Lyonnais players
Leicester City F.C. players
Doncaster Rovers F.C. players
FC Rouen players
AS Saint-Priest players
FC Sète 34 players
AS Beauvais Oise players
AS Béziers (2007) players
French expatriate footballers
French expatriate sportspeople in England
Expatriate footballers in England
People from Villeurbanne
Sportspeople from Lyon Metropolis
Footballers from Auvergne-Rhône-Alpes